Azibaola Robert (born 13 February 1969) is a Nigerian entrepreneur, Fellow of the Nigerian Society of Engineers (NSE), industrialist, lawyer, human and environmental rights advocate, founder of Zeetin Engineering Limited, Managing Director of Kakatar Group and a receiver of Vanguard Personality award of the year. Robert studied law at the Rivers State University of Science and Technology, Portharcourt, (now Rivers State University) and was called to the Nigerian bar in 1995.

Early life and career 
Robert was born in the Otakeme community, Bayelsa, in 1969. He studied law at the Rivers State University of Science and Technology before he was called to the Nigerian bar in 1995. In 1999, Robert founded Mangrovetech Limited, a civil engineering company that metamorphosed into Kakatar. In 2018, Azibaola founded Zeetin Engineering to produce high-end technology and heavy-duty equipment to produce the first electrical automobile in Nigeria. Later, the Nigerian Society of Engineers conferred on him a Fellow of the society. In 2021, he initiated a campaign to preserve rainforests and their wildlife in his country. He led the Niger Delta Human and Environmental Rescue Organisation (ND-HERO) to advocate peace and environmental justice in the Niger Delta region. As of 1993, Robert served as the NANS vice president. He is a cousin to Goodluck Jonathan, former president of the federal republic of Nigeria.

Adventure into the Niger-delta forest 

Azibaola underwent a 14 days expedition into one of the Niger Delta deep forests with his team aimed at showcasing the nature documentary, preservation, and impact of climate change on the entity as a result of the adverse environmental practices by the inhabitants of the region by seeking collaboration with the ecological enthusiasts, government, and mission-aligned organizations. The two hour documentary-film series highlighted the story of his people and living in the creek. The adventure was a journey of 25 kilometers from human civilization, while the team covered over 400 kilometers to explore the forest.

Controversies 
In 2016, the Economic and Financial Crimes Commission (EFCC) charged Robert and his company One Plus Holding Limited to court on a seven count charge for taking possession of the sum of  $40 million from the Office of the former National Security Adviser [NSA], Col. Sambo Dasuki and converting same for personal use. He was later discharged and acquitted by a Federal High Court in Abuja.

According to the Nigerian Tribune,  Justice Nnamdi Dimgba of a Federal High Court in Abuja, delivered the case that the EFCC failed to provide enough evidence for the money laundering charge against him for receiving money from Sambo Mohammed Dasuki without any contract agreement. The case was later transferred to the Nigerian Court of Appeal, where a three-person panel led by Justice Stephen Adah decided that the prosecution failed to establish a prima facie case against the defendants.

External link 
Official website

Gallery

References 

Living people
Nigerian lawyers
Nigerian environmentalists
Nigerian activists
1969 births
Rivers State University alumni
People from Bayelsa State